Dolomieu is a commune in the Isère department in southeastern France.

Population

Twin towns
Dolomieu is twinned with:

  Agordo, Italy, since 2005

Personalities
Mathematician Élie Joseph Cartan was born here in 1869. 
Also geologist Déodat Gratet de Dolomieu was born here in 1750.

See also
Communes of the Isère department

References

Communes of Isère
Isère communes articles needing translation from French Wikipedia